Vi Hilbert (née Anderson, Lushootseed name: taqʷšəblu, July 24, 1918 – December 19, 2008) was a Native American tribal elder of the Upper Skagit, a tribe of the greater Coast Salish in Washington state, whose ancestors occupied the banks along the Skagit River, and was a conservationist of the Lushootseed culture and its language, of which she was the last fully fluent heritage speaker. She taught Lushootseed at the University of Washington for 17 years (1971 - 1988), where she also transcribed and translated Lushootseed recordings from the 1950s. This work is preserved in the University's audio library.

She was named a Washington Living Treasure in 1989, and received a National Heritage Fellowship from the National Endowment for the Arts, presented by President Bill Clinton, in 1994. She co-wrote Lushootseed grammars and dictionaries, partially with linguist Thom Hess, and published books of stories, teachings, and place names related to her native region, the Puget Sound (also known as Whulge, anglicized from Lushootseed x̌ʷə́lč /χʷəlcç/).

Childhood 
Hilbert was born to Charlie and Louise Anderson on July 24, 1918 near Lyman, Washington, on the Upper Skagit River. She was the only one of their eight children to live past the age of 3. Her parents spoke Lushootseed with each other and their friends, which encouraged the young Hilbert to begin to learn the language. Her father was a fisherman, a logger, and a canoe maker, whose canoe the "Question Mark" is housed in the Smithsonian Museum Archive. The family moved frequently in search of work, which resulted in Hilbert attending 15 different schools. For a while, she attended a boarding school at Tulalip. In high school, she attended the Chemawa Indian Boarding School near Salem, Oregon. From there, she transferred to Franklin High School in Portland to get the best education she could find, while working as a domestic to support herself financially.

Experience in World War II 
In an interview, Hilbert stated that she was nearly a victim of the US policy of internment of Japanese Americans, however, she was ultimately able to prove her Native American heritage.

Personal life 
Hilbert was married three times. Her first marriage was to Percy Woodcock in 1936 and they lived together in Taholah, Washington. They had two children: son Denny, born in 1937, and daughter Lois, born in 1938. Denny died of meningitis in 1940, after which the couple separated and she moved to Nooksack (near Bellingham, Washington) to live with her parents.

Hilbert's second marriage was to Bob Coy in 1942 at Tulalip (near Marysville, Washington). She gave birth to son Ron in 1943.

Her third and final marriage  was in 1945 to Henry Donald "Donny" Hilbert, who honorably served in World War II, surviving the attack on Pearl Harbor while aboard the USS West Virginia. Donny subsequently adopted Hilbert's children from her previous marriages. They lived in a house they built in south Seattle until 2003, when they moved to Bow, Washington. Donny preceded Hilbert in death.

Death 
Hilbert died at her home in La Conner on the morning of December 19, 2008. She was surrounded by her family at the time of her death.

The taqʷšəblu Vi Hilbert Ethnobotanical Garden, and Vi Hilbert Hall at Seattle University are named in her honor.

References

External links

1918 births
2008 deaths
Native American writers
Lushootseed language
Linguists of Salishan languages
National Heritage Fellowship winners
Last known speakers of a Native American language
Native American women writers
20th-century Native American women
20th-century Native Americans
21st-century Native American women
21st-century Native Americans
20th-century linguists
21st-century linguists